Emmanuel de Grouchy, 2nd Marquis of Grouchy (23 October 176629 May 1847) was a French general and Marshal of the Empire.

Biography
Grouchy was born in Condécourt (Val d'Oise), Château de Villette, the son of François-Jacques de Grouchy, 1st Marquis de Grouchy (born 1715) and intellectual wife Gilberte Fréteau de Pény (died 1793). His sister was Sophie de Condorcet, a noted feminist. He entered the French artillery in 1779: in 1782 he was transferred to the cavalry, and subsequently, in 1786, to the Gardes du Corps. In spite of his aristocratic birth and his connections with the court (as his father, having served as a page, was rumoured to be the illegitimate son of king Louis XV), he was a convinced supporter of the principles of the Revolution, and had in consequence to leave the Guards.

About the time of the outbreak of war in 1792 Grouchy became colonel of the Régiment de Condé-Dragons, and soon afterwards, as a maréchal de camp, he was sent to serve on the south-eastern frontier. In 1793 he distinguished himself in La Vendée, and was promoted Général de division. Grouchy was shortly afterwards deprived of his rank as being of noble birth, but in 1795 he was again placed on the active list.  He served on the staff of the Army of Ireland (1796–1797), and took a conspicuous part in the Irish expedition. In 1798 he administered the civil and military government of Piedmont at the time of the abdication of the king of Sardinia, and in 1799 he distinguished himself greatly as a divisional commander in the campaign against the Austrians and Russians. In covering the retreat of the French after the defeat of Novi, Grouchy received fourteen wounds and was taken prisoner.

On his release Grouchy returned to France. In spite of his having protested against the coup d'état of the 18 Brumaire he was at once re-employed by the First Consul, and distinguished himself again at Hohenlinden. It was not long before he accepted the new régime in France, and from 1801 onwards he was employed by Napoleon in military and political positions of importance. He served in Austria in 1805, in Prussia in 1806, Poland in 1807, where he distinguished himself at Eylau and Friedland, Spain in 1808, and commanded the cavalry of the Army of Italy in 1809 in the Viceroy Eugène's advance to Vienna.

In 1812 he was made commander of the III Cavalry Corps. He led the corps at Smolensk and Borodino and during the retreat from Moscow Napoleon appointed him to command the escort squadron, which was composed entirely of picked officers. His almost continuous service with the cavalry led Napoleon to decline in 1813 to place Grouchy at the head of an army corps, and Grouchy thereupon retired to France.

In 1814, however, he hastened to take part in the defensive campaign in France, and he was severely wounded at Craonne. At the Restoration he was deprived of the post of colonel-general of Chasseurs à Cheval and retired.

In 1815, he joined Napoleon on his return from Elba, and was made Marshal (against the recommendation of Marshal Davout, then Minister for War) and peer of France. In the Waterloo Campaign he commanded the reserve cavalry of the army, and after Battle of Ligny he was appointed to command the right wing to pursue the Prussians.

Napoleon sent Grouchy to pursue a part of the retreating Prussian army under the command of General Johann von Thielmann. On 17 June, Grouchy was unable to close with the Prussians. Despite hearing the cannon sound from the nearby Battle of Waterloo, he decided to follow the Prussians along the route literally specified in his orders, issued by Napoleon via Marshal Soult, while the Prussian and British-Dutch armies united to crush Napoleon. He won a tactical victory over the Prussian army's rearguard at the Battle of Wavre on 18–19 June 1815, but the delaying action by III Corps allowed the main Prussian force to join Wellington at Waterloo while preventing Grouchy from doing the same.

So far as resistance was possible after the great disaster, Grouchy made it. He gathered up the wrecks of Napoleon's army and retired, swiftly and unbroken, to Paris, where, after interposing his reorganized forces between the enemy and the capital, he resigned his command into the hands of Marshal Davout.

The rest of his life was spent in defending himself. An attempt to have him condemned to death by a court-martial failed, but he was exiled and lived in the United States of America until amnestied in 1821 (the year of Napoleon's death on St. Helena). On his return to France he was reinstated as general, but not as marshal nor as peer of France. For many years thereafter he was equally an object of aversion to the court party, as a member of their own caste who had followed the Revolution and Napoleon, and to his comrades of the Grande Armée as the supposed betrayer of Napoleon. In 1830 Louis Philippe gave him back the marshal's baton and restored him to the Chamber of Peers. After traveling throughout Italy during the winter, he died in Saint-Étienne while on his way home, on 29 May 1847. He was buried in the Père Lachaise Cemetery

Family
He was married firstly (1785) to Cécile le Doulcet de Pontécoulant (1767–1827), sister of Louis Gustave le Doulcet, comte de Pontécoulant, by whom he had 4 children:
Ernestine (1787–1866)
Alphonse (1789–1864)
Aimee-Clementine (1791–1826)
Victor (1796–1864)

He married secondly, in 1827, Joséphine-Fanny Hua (1802–1889) and had 1 daughter:
Noemie (1830–1843)

Works 
Grouchy published the following:
 Observations sur la relation de la campagne de 1815 par le général de Gourgaud (Philadelphia and Paris, 1818)
 Refutation de quelques articles des mémoires de M. le Duc de Rovigo (Paris,1829)
 Fragments Historiques Relatifs a la Campagne de 1815 et a la Bataille de Waterloo (Paris, 1829–1830) —  in reply to Barthélemy and Méry, and to Marshal Gérard
 Reclamation du marchal de Grouchy (Paris, 1834)
 Plainte contre le general Baron Berthezène — Berthezène, formerly a divisional commander under Gérard, stated in reply to this defence that he had no intention of accusing Grouchy of ill faith.

References

Sources

Attribution
 Endnotes:
Mémoires du maréchal Marquis de Grouchy, éditeur Édouard Dentu (Paris, 1873–1874);
General Marquis de Grouchy, Le Général Grouchy en Irlande (Paris, 1866)
Le Maréchal Grouchy du 16 au 18 juin, 1815 (Paris, 1864)
Appel à l'histoire sur les faites de l'aile droite de l'armée française (Paris, n.d.)
Sévère Justice sur les faits ... du 28 juin au 3 juillet, 1815 (Paris, 1866)

1766 births
1847 deaths
Politicians from Paris
Marquesses of Grouchy
Counts of the First French Empire
Marshals of France
French military personnel of the French Revolutionary Wars
French Republican military leaders of the French Revolutionary Wars
Republican military leaders of the War in the Vendée
Marshals of the First French Empire
Burials at Père Lachaise Cemetery
Members of the Chamber of Peers of the Hundred Days
Members of the Chamber of Peers of the July Monarchy
Names inscribed under the Arc de Triomphe